Lake Dibawah (means: Lower Lake; Minangnese: Danau Dibawah) is a lake in West Sumatra, Indonesia. This lake together with Lake Diatas, are known as the Twin Lakes (Danau Kembar).

See also
 List of lakes of Indonesia

Dibawah
Landforms of West Sumatra